The  is the 20th edition of the Japan Film Professional Awards. It awarded the best of 2010 in film. The film preview was held on May 31, 2011 at Kadokawa Cinema Shinjuku instead of the ceremony.

Awards 
Best Film: Sawako Decides
Best Director: Takahisa Zeze (Heaven's Story)
Best Actress: Yuki Uchida (Bakamono)
Best Actor: Sousuke Takaoka (Sankaku)
Best New Director: Tetsuya Mariko (Yellow Kid)
Best New Encouragement: Kengo Kora (Kenta to Jun to Kayochan no Kuni)
Best New Encouragement: Kiko Mizuhara (Norwegian Wood)
Special: Mitsuru Kurosawa (For his longtime work.)

10 best films
 Sawako Decides (Yuya Ishii)
 Heaven's Story (Takahisa Zeze)
 Hero Show (Kazuyuki Izutsu)
 GeGeGe no Nyōbō (Takuji Suzuki)
 Haru to no Tabi (Masahiro Kobayashi)
 Yellow Kid (Tetsuya Mariko)
 Kenta to Jun to Kayochan no Kuni (Tatsushi Ōmori)
 Sketches of Kaitan City (Kazuyoshi Kumakiri)
 Outrage (Takeshi Kitano)
 Colorful (Keiichi Hara)

References

External links
  

Japan Film Professional Awards
2011 in Japanese cinema
Japan Film Professional Awards
May 2011 events in Japan